Manjilas Ouseph Joseph (15 January 1929 – 8 January 2016) was a Malayalam producer. He produced over 30 films in the 1960s and 1970s, most notably Yakshi, Adimakal, Devi, Chattakkari, Anubhavangal Palichakal, and Punarjanmam. He won numerous awards including National Film Awards and Kerala State Film Awards and two Filmfare Awards South.

Early life
Joseph was born in 1929, and grew up in the bustling temple town of Thrissur, where his father was the manager of the Jose Theatre. The Jose Theatre has the distinction of having been the first cinema theatre to be set up in Kerala, as early as 1913. Joseph studied at the St. Thomas College, Thrissur and then completed his graduation in B.Com from the Sacred Heart College in Ernakulam, where his father had joined the Shenoy Theatres. When he had completed his studies, his father suggested that he join T. E. Vasudevan who was distributing and producing films under the banner of Associated Pictures as an apprentice. Joseph joined them in 1950 on an initial salary of Rs. 150 per month and quickly picked up the skills required in the role. Associated Pictures was a partnership with the Shenoys as financial partners, but some years later,  Vasudevan launched out on his own and started JayaMaruthi Pictures.  Joseph joined him.

Joseph moved to Chennai in 1951 to manage the regional business of Associated Pictures.  By 1966, Joseph had built his own contacts in the industry, and was ready to start out on his own. His first foray into independent film making was in a partnership with P. Balthazar, who was a neighbor in Kodambakkam, and Balthazar's cousin, NV Joseph. Balthazar was a businessman dealing with contract work and trading, and wanted to get into films. Joseph provided that opportunity, and this partnership which was called Navjeevan Films, resulted in two films
The first film, ‘Naadan Pennu’ was launched in 1967, which was directed by KS Sethumadhavan, who would go on to direct some of the best Malayalam films of those times. The film established Joseph's credibility in the industry as a good producer, and broke even in commercial terms. The second film did likewise. It was ‘Thokkukal Kadha Parayunnu’, which was also directed by Sethumadhavan, and featured the leading actors of those times, including Sathyan, Prem Nazir and Sheela.

In the run up to the third film, there were differences among the partners. Joseph had decided to produce a film on the unlikely story of a young man who confuses his love with a ghost. He was convinced that it would make a great story, but his partners did not like the idea, so they parted ways. ‘Yakshi’, based on a story written by Malayattoor Ramakrishnan, turned out to be a big hit, and established the new banner, Manjilas after the family name, as a new household name in Kerala. The film was noted for its excellent cinematography, by Melli Irani. Its music, composed by Devarajan was a highlight of this all-time musical hit.

Notable Manjilas Films
Joseph believed in good quality, and he followed this philosophy right from the beginning. He researched extensively to select the right stories, engaged the best actors, and took great care to ensure that every shot was well done. It made good business sense, for he made an impact with financiers, who recognized in him, the ability to deliver reliably each time.

In most of his films the same set of actors performed. The leading pair would often be the same and Adoor Bhasi, Bahadoor and Sankaradi would be the stock comedians. The father of the girl would invariably be played by Sankaradi. Paravoor Bharathan, Sathyan, Prem Nazir, Oommar, Madhu and Soman were some of the leading male actors, and the female lead roles were played by Sheela, Jaya Bharathy, Sharada, Vidhu Bala, and Laxmi among others.

The Manjilas banner produced a series of good films. Joseph came up with bold and unusual stories, juxtaposed in the social milieu of those times. ‘Kadal Paalam’ is the story of an arrogant father and his efforts to retain control over his family. In this movie, Sathyan plays a dual role, that of the blind and obstinate father, as well as that of his rebellious son. Written by KT Mohammad, and directed by KS Sethumadhavan, the film was critically well acclaimed, and a box office hit.

In ‘Vazhave Maayam’, he told the story of an older man married to a young and beautiful woman. Sathyan in the lead, begins to suspect that his wife, played by Sheela, has a lover. This culminates in a scene when a sheepish Sathyan is exposed, while spying on his wife, hidden in a cupboard in the bedroom. The enraged Sheela then packs her bags, never to return. Pride and circumstance keep both man and woman from coming together again. The story also stood out for the message that it was possible for a married woman to carve out a new life, instead of moping and languishing in a corner; instead, it was the man who wasted his life in this story. Most of Joseph's films featured strong female characters, who were integral to the story being told. There was no stereotyping of characters, or any application of formula to making a movie.

‘Anubhavangal Paalichakal’ is another landmark film, which released in 1971. The story is based on Thakazhi’s novel of the same name. The film recounts the experience of a union leader, easily provoked to violence, who came to be regarded as a champion of the working class. His rebellious life runs in parallel to his personal story, where his wife, who does not get his attention or time, becomes closer to a co-worker. As the protagonist goes to jail for a murder he commits, she starts living with the other man in her life.

The film deals sympathetically with both the union leader's compulsions, as well as the motives and challenges which persuade the leading lady, played by Sheela, to take a second husband. In the final part of the story, Sathyan discovers his wife’s infidelity, but does not take the conventional revenge on the other man, but simply gives himself up to the police.

Utpal Dutt, on seeing Sathyan's performance in ‘Anubhavangal Paalichakal’ - remarked
"in the face lined with the agony and threats of an ordinary laborer …I could discern the great talent of Sathyan portraying the inner chaos of an ordinary worker…"

This was the last film of Sathyan. In fact, he died suddenly, before the film was completed, and the film had to be completed by a double. The death of Sathyan was a double blow to Joseph, as besides being a leading man in many of his movies, he was also a close friend. Joseph went out of his way to ensure that Sathyan got a farewell befitting the icon that he had become.
Ara Naayika Neram was produced in 1970, directed by Sethumadhavan. It is a gloomy saga of a decadent family as witnessed through the eyes of the grand old patriarch-Kunjochanam (Kottarakkara). We are given insight into the lives of different members of this family, and come across an interesting range of characters. After witnessing many a tragedy and ups and downs the octogenarian is struck with paralysis and loses his power of speech. He then he suffers the rudest shock of his life when he sees his daughter-in-law carry on an affair with an opium dealer. The opium dealer poisons him for fear of their secret being let out if ever he regains his speech. The film ends with the guilt ridden daughter-in-law committing suicide.

Punarjanmam was another landmark film. It was based on a novel written by Dr AT Kovoor, who had become famous for his fight against blind belief in rituals and customs. He used to write in a Malayalam weekly called ‘Jaya Kerala’ which Joseph read. Someone wrote a letter to the editor that Punar Janmam, the novel written by Dr Kovoor, would make a good movie, and only Manjilas could do justice to the story. This letter attracted Joseph's attention. He got in touch with Kovoor, and bought the film rights to the story. Kovoor was based in Sri Lanka (Ceylon in those days). The two men soon became friends. When the shooting was going on, Dr. Kovoor came and stayed with Joseph's family in Madras several times. Punarjanmam proved to be a super hit!

Another superhit film was ‘Chattakkari’ which was later produced in Hindi by Nagi Reddy as ‘Julie’. 'Chattakkari’ was the story of an Anglo-Indian family who were coming to terms with the new Indian reality. Both the Malayalam and Hindi films made waves in those times, and are well remembered by the general public.

In the 1960s and ‘70s, Malayalam cinema was fairly prolific. Around 30 films were produced each year, of which the Manjilas banner often came out with 2 or 3 films. The shooting for each film was mostly done outdoors and would be completed in a stretch of some three to four weeks. The remaining shots which were based on fabricated sets were done in one of the studios in Kodambakkam. The big studio houses were Vidya Studios, Vahini Studios and Bharani Studios.

Production houses like Manjilas operated on lean budgets and lean staffing. They would enter into individual contracts with the actors for each film, and then would get them to sign call sheets which helped block dates of the actors and helped firm up the calendar for the year. The company would have just two or three staff employees who took care of coordination, procurement and accounts. Joseph would himself handle the functions of theme and story selection, casting and production. He would closely involve himself with every stage of production.
The direction for almost 15 of his movies was done by KS Sethumadhavan, so the two were very close to  each other. Other directors who he worked with include Thoppil Baasi, the well known script writer who directed Ponni, and IV Sashi who directed ‘Njaan Njaan Maatram’ and ‘Ivvar’.

The Manjilas banner produced some 25 films in total, from 1968 to 1984. Joseph maintained control on all the departments of film making. He would even sit with the script writer, giving suggestions on how to turn a story. He would also carefully read each script and make detailed corrections. The Malayalam film world was a smaller community in those days. Joseph's good friends were Vayalar Ravi (writer), Thoppil Baasi (writer), KG Menon, Sathyan (lead actor) and Vasudevan Nair (producer) and he relied on his interaction with these men, artists and men of letters for his ideas and the direction that his films would take.

Contributions To Malayalam Film Industry

Joseph also played an important role in establishing several key institutions in the Malayalam Film industry. He was one of the founders along with Ramu Karyat and TE Vasudevan, of the Malayalam Chalachitra Parishad, an organization to help aged and needy film artistes and their families. In the beginning, the office of the Parishad started in the Manjilas office.  When Sathyan died, his body was kept in the Manjilas office for public display, since it was also the office of the Chalachitra Parishad.

Later, Joseph helped raise funds for the organization by organizing Star Nites, which were a hugely popular mix of show-biz, music and drama, which were held in different towns of Kerala. Stars such as Prem Nazir and  Sheila and singers such as P. Leela contributed their time to these shows. From the funds collected through these Star Nites, and from donations, the Parishad was able to buy its own land in Mambalam, Chennai and construct its own double storied offices. Joseph continued as the Treasurer of the Parishad for many years. He was also a founder member of the management committee of Asan Memorial Group of institutions and functional as its Vice President.

Family
He married Kunjamma Joseph at the age of 24 in 1953. They have five children.

Filmography
MO Joseph and Manjilas contributed some of the most iconic films of his times. A list of his films and some of the awards won

Awards
Joseph was recognized for his ‘outstanding contribution to the growth and development of Malayalam films’ by K. Karunakaran, Chief Minister of Kerala in 1985. In 1996, he was again awarded for ‘outstanding contribution to Malayalam cinema’ by the Government of Kerala. Some of the other notable awards that he has received include:
 Contribution to Malayalam Film Industry, Kerala Film Producers Association, 2001
 Creative Producer, Amrutha Film Fraternity, 2005
 Outstanding contribution to Malayalam Cinema, Kerala State Film Development Corporation, 2007

Filmfare Awards South
 Filmfare Award for Best Film - Malayalam - Adimakal (1969)
 Filmfare Award for Best Film - Malayalam - Vazhve Mayam (1970)

Death
Joseph died on 8 January 2016 at his home in San Thomas, Chennai just before his 87th birthday.

References

External links
 Legendary producer M O Joseph passes away
 M.O.Joseph - Producer Manjilas - Interview

1929 births
2016 deaths
Malayalam film producers
20th-century Indian businesspeople
Film producers from Thrissur